In Thee Rejoiceth may refer to:
 In Thee Rejoiceth (Klontzas), a painting by Georgios Klontzas
 In Thee Rejoiceth (Poulakis), a painting by Theodore Poulakis